Vanessa Barbara (born June 14, 1982) is a Brazilian journalist and author. She is a columnist for the newspaper O Estado de S. Paulo, having also written for the magazine piauí and the newspaper Folha de S. Paulo. Her articles are also featured in the International New York Times.

Barbara won the 2009 Jabuti Prize in Journalism for her work O Livro Amarelo do Terminal, about the Tietê Bus Terminal. She was shortlisted for the São Paulo Prize for Literature in 2008 for her debut book O Verão do Chibo. She was also listed by Granta among the Best of Young Brazilian Novelists in 2012.

Works
2008 - O Verão do Chibo (novel, with Emilio Fraia) - Ed. Alfaguara
2009 - O livro amarelo do Terminal (news story) - Ed. Cosac Naify
2010 - Endrigo, O Escavador de Umbigos (children's book, with  Andrés Sandoval) - Ed. 34
2012 - A máquina de Goldberg (graphic novel, with Fido Nesti) - Companhia das Letras
2013 - Noites de alface (novel) - Ed. Alfaguara
2015  - Operação Impensável - Ed. Intrínseca

Awards and recognitions
2009 São Paulo Prize for Literature — Shortlisted in the Best Book of the Year category for O Verão do Chibo
 2012 Granta Best of Young Brazilian Novelists

References

External links 
 Vanessa Barbara's columns in The New York Times

1982 births
Living people
Brazilian women novelists
21st-century Brazilian novelists
Brazilian journalists
Brazilian women journalists
21st-century Brazilian women writers